Welcome to L.A. is a 1976 American drama musical romance film directed by Alan Rudolph and starring Keith Carradine and an ensemble cast. The film focuses on themes of romantic despair and shallowness in the decadent upper class during the 1970s, illustrated through a La Ronde-like circle of sexual adventures and failed affairs revolving around a womanizing songwriter, his businessman father, and their associates.

Though director Alan Rudolph, a protege of Robert Altman, went on to direct far better and more successful movies, Welcome to L.A. is considered a failed attempt early in his career.

Plot

Celebrity musician Eric Wood (Richard Baskin) plans to record an album of songs written by Carroll Barber (Carradine), who has been living in England. Carroll's aging manager Susan Moore (Viveca Lindfors) brings Carroll to Los Angeles for the recording sessions, and rents him a house from real estate agent Ann Goode (Sally Kellerman). Ann is unhappily married to furniture store owner Jack Goode (John Considine), who is pursuing their young housemaid, Linda Murray (Sissy Spacek). Linda in turn wants a relationship with her friend Kenneth "Ken" Hood (Harvey Keitel), a married young executive.

Susan expects Carroll to resume a past affair they had, but he rejects her and instead has sex with Ann when she shows him his house. Ann tries unsuccessfully to continue the affair by dropping in on Carroll at home and bringing Linda over to clean. However, Carroll shows himself to be a womanizer, seemingly incapable of connecting with anyone. He visits his wealthy father Carl, whom he has not seen in three years. Carl, with the help of Ken Hood, has built the small Barber family dairy into a major business. Carroll ends up having affairs with receptionist Jeannette (Diahnne Abbott) and his father's photographer mistress Nona (Lauren Hutton).

Ken works long hours at the Barber business and neglects his wife, Karen (Geraldine Chaplin), a housewife and mother who is obsessed with taxi rides and the Greta Garbo film Camille.  While Carroll is drinking and driving through the city, he randomly meets Karen and is drawn to her. He takes her to his home but when he tries to romance her, she reveals she is married (though not to whom) and departs. She later leaves him her telephone number, but refuses to take his repeated calls. Linda, who has moved into Carroll's spare room, invites Ken to visit her there, where he meets Ann.

Just before Christmas, Ken is thrilled to learn that Carl has made him partner in the business, but Karen is not happy that he will be spending even more time at work. On Christmas Eve, Ken gets drunk and calls Ann, but their date ends badly as Ken can't stop thinking of his wife. Meanwhile, Jack and Linda spend the evening together, which also ends badly when Linda asks Jack for money. Jack and Ann, both disappointed, return home and have sex with each other.

An angry Susan reveals to Carroll that Eric doesn't like his songs, and that she and Carroll's father bribed Eric to record the album in order to get Carroll to come to Los Angeles. Susan and Carl each hoped to build their separate relationships with Carroll, only to be thwarted by his lack of response. Karen, the only person who seems to have truly piqued Carroll's interest, finally appears at his home, but just as they are about to have sex, Ken telephones, upset and looking for his wife. Upon realizing that Karen is Ken's wife and seems primarily interested in her husband, Carroll leaves while Karen and Ken are reconciling on the phone, just as Linda arrives home. Linda, eavesdropping, hears the voice of Ken, her own crush, on the phone, saying the same things to Karen about relationships that he earlier said to Linda. Linda furtively disconnects the phone, then tries to bond with Karen, who imitates Garbo in Camille.  Carroll goes to the recording studio and discovers that Eric Wood has decided not to finish the album.

Cast
 Keith Carradine as Carroll Barber
 Sally Kellerman as Ann Goode
 Geraldine Chaplin as Karen Hood
 Harvey Keitel as Ken Hood
 Lauren Hutton as Nona Bruce
 Sissy Spacek as Linda Murray
 Viveca Lindfors as Susan Moore
 Denver Pyle as Carl Barber
 John Considine as Jack Goode
 Richard Baskin as Eric Wood
 Allan F. Nicholls as Dana Howard
 Cedric Scott as Faye
 Mike E. Kaplan as Russell Linden
 Diahnne Abbott as Jeannette Ross

Critical reception
Welcome to L.A was widely panned as an empty, vacuous, pretentious film with the music by Richard Baskin deemed especially grating. The New York Times critic Richard Eder wrote: "The songs are a particular torment. The music whines, the lyrics complain, and Mr. Carradine sings them with a kind of hushed writhing, like a worm dying at the bottom of a barrel."

John Simon called Welcome to L.A. a dumb and corrupt film. TimeOut said the film was interesting in retrospect but that "it lacks both the inspirational spontaneity of his producer and mentor Altman's best work, and the warmth of his own later films".

One of the few critics to support the film at the time was Jack Kroll of Newsweek who described the film as an "extraordinary debut" for Rudolph, continuing that the director "does a remarkable job of weaving this gallery of neurotics into a vivid pattern of sharp, distilled performances." Kroll also considered Rudolph's work with Robert Altman, "he's gone beyond even Altman's example in shaping a film from a total design concept." Furthermore, he praised Rudolph for creating a "Los Angeles that's shimmering Xanadu of psychic uncertainty. Mirrors reassemble people into soulless human collages. The swoosh of Hutton's ever-present Nikon sounds like a little guillotine beheading reality. The quavering cadences of Baskin's music evoke both the sweetness and self-indulgence of Carroll Barber. Cinematographer Dave Myers works like the new realist painters, capturing a metropolis of burnished surfaces that seems to dissolve the will in an amber nullity of light."

The Turner Classic Movies (TCM) capsule review warns, "The music score by Richard Baskin may affect your viewing pleasure." 
 
Geraldine Chaplin was nominated for a British Academy Film Award for Best Supporting Actress.

It has also been cited as an example of hyperlink cinema.

Home media
It was first released on DVD October 26, 2011.

Kino Lorber released the film on Blu-ray December 1, 2015.

References

External links 
 
 
 TCM.com

1976 drama films
1970s English-language films
1976 films
Films directed by Alan Rudolph
Films set in Los Angeles
United Artists films
Hyperlink films
American drama films
Films about music and musicians
1970s American films